The Charysh (Çaras) is a river in south-western Siberia in Russia, flowing into the left bank of the Ob. Its largest tributaries are the Inya, Belaya and Loktevka from the left, and the Maralikha from the right. The main settlements on the Charysh are Ust-Kan, Charyshskoye, Krasnoshchyokovo, Ust-Kalmanka and Ust-Charyshskaya Pristan.

Beloglazovo is a village located on the Charysh.

References

Rivers of the Altai Republic
Rivers of Altai Krai